This is a list of members of the Australian Senate from 1 July 2002 to 30 June 2005. Half of the state senators had been elected at the November 2001 election and had terms due to finish on 30 June 2008; the other half of the state senators had been elected at the October 1998 election and had terms due to finish on 30 June 2005. The territory senators were elected at the November 2001 election and their terms ended at the next federal election, which was October 2004.

Notes

References

Members of Australian parliaments by term
21st-century Australian politicians
Australian Senate lists